Bank Negara Indonesia ( 'State Bank of Indonesia'), is an Indonesian state-owned bank. It has branches primarily in Indonesia, but it can also found in Seoul, Singapore, Hong Kong, Tokyo, London and New York. It had 1000 branches and over 9 million customers in 2006. It is listed on the Indonesia Stock Exchange as "BBNI". Its market capitalization as of 12 March 2007 was 23.8 trillion rupiah (approximately US$2.6 billion). It is the fourth-largest bank of Indonesia in terms of assets.

History

Early years
Bank Negara Indonesia was established on 5 July 1946. It was prepared to be the Central Bank of Indonesia with the task of issuing and handling Indonesian currency. A few months after its establishment, Bank Negara Indonesia officially distributed the first official currency of Indonesia – ORI or Oeang Republik Indonesia.

Following the appointment of De Javasche Bank as the Central Bank of Indonesia, Bank Negara Indonesia had its role shifted to that of a development bank, and was later given the right to serve as a foreign exchange bank. Following increased capitalization in 1955, the legal status of Bank Negara Indonesia was changed into that of a commercial bank through a judicial assignment under Emergency Law number 2 of the year 1955. Also in 1955, Bank Negara Indonesia officially opened its first foreign branch in Singapore.

Bank Negara Indonesia 1946
After a merger period with several other commercial banks, the function and individuality of the Bank were restored in 1968. The status was resumed to that of a state-run commercial bank. The official name was changed to 'Bank Negara Indonesia 1946'.

Bank Negara Indonesia 1946 conducted an operational restructuring program, by formulating the 'Performance Improvement Program' to facilitate a more dynamic role in facing the continuously changing environment. The program covered various aspects, including the improvement of the Corporate Vision and Mission, the refinement of strategic plans, as well as the development of technology and human resources.

Bank Negara Indonesia

Signifying the determination of Bank Negara Indonesia 1946 to create a new image and attitudes in line with its aspiration to play a more international role and to respond to the challenges of globalization, the Bank changed its corporate logo into a 'Sailing Boat' and introduced the nickname of 'Bank BNI'.

The law number 7 of the year 1992 opened-up opportunities for state-run banks to change their legal status into Limited State-Owned Corporations (or Persero). With this change in legal status, the Bank's name was officially replaced with 'PT. Bank Negara Indonesia (Persero)'.

In 1996, Bank Negara Indonesia's decision to become a public company was manifested through an initial public offering (IPO) of its shares through the stock exchange. Bank Negara Indonesia was the first government bank in Indonesia which listed its shares on both the Jakarta Stock Exchange (now Indonesia Stock Exchange) and the Surabaya Stock Exchange. The corporate name was amended to 'PT. Bank Negara Indonesia (Persero) Tbk', to show its status as a public company.

The government's banking recapitalization program, launched after the economic crisis, provided Bank Negara Indonesia with additional capital of IDR 61,2 trillion.

Recent development (BNI '46)
The bank introduced the latest logo in 2004. The nickname 'Bank BNI' was changed to 'BNI'.

Offices worldwide
 Bank Negara Indonesia Singapore, operated under a full bank license granted by the Monetary Authority of Singapore
 Bank Negara Indonesia Tokyo
 Bank Negara Indonesia Hong Kong
 Bank Negara Indonesia London
 Bank Negara Indonesia New York
 Bank Negara Indonesia Seoul
 Bank Negara Indonesia Melbourne

Sports sponsorships
In football, from 2012 until 2014 Bank Negara Indonesia was the official regional partner of Premier League football club Chelsea Football Club in Indonesia.

In motorsports, since 2016 Bank Negara Indonesia currently is the official personal sponsor of Sean Gelael and official banking partner of Team Jagonya Ayam racing management.

Slogans
 1994–2003: Terpercaya, Kokoh dan Bersahabat
 2003-2004: Melayani dengan Kebanggaan Sebagai Anak Negeri
 2004–present: Melayani Negeri, Kebanggaan Bangsa

Notes

References

External links
 Official site
 Bank Negara Indonesia, Singapore Branch website
 (Indonesian and Japanese) Bank Negara Indonesia, Tokyo Branch website

See also

 Wisma 46
 Bank Indonesia
 List of banks in Indonesia

1946 establishments in Indonesia
1996 initial public offerings
Banks established in 1946
 
Banks of Indonesia
Companies listed on the Indonesia Stock Exchange
Government-owned banks of Indonesia
Indonesian brands
Indonesian companies established in 1946